Amaurobius candia is a species of spider in the family Amaurobiidae, found in Crete.

References

candia
Fauna of Crete
Spiders of Europe
Spiders described in 2002